This is the results breakdown of the local elections held in Andalusia on 24 May 2015. The following tables show detailed results in the autonomous community's most populous municipalities, sorted alphabetically.

Opinion polls

Overall

City control
The following table lists party control in the most populous municipalities, including provincial capitals (shown in bold). Gains for a party are displayed with the cell's background shaded in that party's colour.

Municipalities

Alcalá de Guadaíra
Population: 74,404

Algeciras
Population: 117,974

Almería
Population: 193,351

Antequera
Population: 41,430

Benalmádena
Population: 66,939

Cádiz
Population: 121,739

Chiclana de la Frontera
Population: 82,298

Córdoba
Population: 328,041

Dos Hermanas
Population: 130,369

Écija
Population: 40,634

El Ejido
Population: 84,144

El Puerto de Santa María
Population: 88,700

Estepona

Fuengirola
Population: 75,856

Granada
Population: 237,540

Huelva
Population: 147,212

Jaén
Population: 115,837

Jerez de la Frontera
Population: 212,226

La Línea de la Concepción
Population: 63,132

Linares
Population: 60,290

Málaga
Population: 566,913

Marbella
Population: 138,679

Mijas

Morón de la Frontera
Population: 28,241

Motril
Population: 60,870

Ronda
Population: 35,059

Roquetas de Mar
Population: 91,682

San Fernando
Population: 96,335

Sanlúcar de Barrameda
Population: 67,385

Seville

Population: 696,676

Torremolinos

Utrera
Population: 52,437

Vélez-Málaga
Population: 77,808

References

Andalusia
2015